Willem "Wim" Frederik van der Kroft (August 16, 1916 – March 21, 2001) was a Dutch canoeist who competed in the 1936 Summer Olympics, in the 1948 Summer Olympics, and in the 1952 Summer Olympics.

He was born in Haarlem and died in Den Helder.

In 1936 he won the bronze medal in the folding K-2 1000 metre competition with his partner Nicolaas Tates.

At the London Games 1948 he finished fifth in the K-1 1000 metre event.

Four years later he finished fourth in the K-1 1000 metre competition.

References
DatabaseOlympics.com profile
Sports-reference.com profile

1916 births
2001 deaths
Dutch male canoeists
Olympic canoeists of the Netherlands
Canoeists at the 1936 Summer Olympics
Canoeists at the 1948 Summer Olympics
Canoeists at the 1952 Summer Olympics
Medalists at the 1936 Summer Olympics
Olympic bronze medalists for the Netherlands
Olympic medalists in canoeing
Sportspeople from Haarlem
20th-century Dutch people
21st-century Dutch people